Temporary maintenance holdings
Mexico
Road transportation in Mexico